Mauro Fiore (born November 15, 1964) is an Italian-American cinematographer.

He was born in Marzi, Calabria and moved to the US with his family in 1971. 
He attended Palatine High School in Palatine, Illinois, and graduated in 1982. He started off pursuing a career in sociology but was captivated by photography and art. He went on to receive his B.A. from Columbia College Chicago in 1987 and moved to Los Angeles to jumpstart his career.

Fiore won the Academy Award for Best Cinematography at the 82nd Academy Awards for his work on the 2009 film Avatar. Previously, he worked on the films Training Day, The Hire: Ticker, Tears of the Sun, Smokin' Aces and The Kingdom. He also worked as cinematographer for the television series Tracey Takes On.... His most recent work was as the director of photography for Spider-Man: No Way Home.

Personal life  
Fiore married Christine Vollmer in 2000. They have three children.

Filmography

Feature films

Short films

Television

References

External links

1964 births
Living people
People from Calabria
People from the Province of Cosenza
American cinematographers
Columbia College Chicago alumni
Italian emigrants to the United States
Best Cinematographer Academy Award winners